Dante Lamar Cunningham (born April 22, 1987) is an American professional basketball player who is playing for Changwon LG Sakers of the KBL. He played college basketball for Villanova before being selected with the 33rd overall pick in the 2009 NBA draft by the Portland Trail Blazers.

Early life
Cunningham was born in Clinton, Maryland, to Searcy Blankenship and Ron Cunningham. His older sister Davalyn played in the WNBA.

High school career
Cunningham began his prep career at St. John's College High School in Washington, D.C. While a junior, he averaged 10 points per game and 7.4 rebounds. One of his teammates, Dwayne Anderson, would later play at Villanova with Cunningham.

As a senior, Cunningham transferred to Potomac High School, which he led to a 27–0 season under Head Coach Rico Reed. He averaged 13 rebounds, 20 points, and four blocked shots per game at Potomac. He was honored as The Washington PostMetropolitan Player of the Year.

College career

At Villanova  Cunningham played in all 33 games and was a starter in four during his freshman year.

In his senior year, Cunningham would go on to lead the team in scoring with 16.1 points and take home the Big East Most Improved Player award. He led the Wildcats to their first Final Four appearance since 1985. Cunningham was named to the 2008–2009 All Big East second team and the 2009 NCAA Tournament All Region .

Professional career

Portland Trail Blazers (2009–2011)
Cunningham was drafted 33rd overall by the Portland Trail Blazers in the 2009 NBA draft. He played for Portland's Las Vegas Summer League team where he averaged over 18 points and 5 rebounds per game in four contests. On August 21, 2009, Cunningham signed his rookie scale contract with the Trail Blazers.

Charlotte Bobcats (2011)
On February 24, 2011, Cunningham was traded, along with Joel Przybilla, Sean Marks and two future first-round draft picks, to the Charlotte Bobcats in exchange for Gerald Wallace.

Memphis Grizzlies (2011–2012)
On December 20, 2011, Cunningham received a three-year, $7 million offer sheet from the Memphis Grizzlies. The Bobcats declined to match the offer and subsequently signed the contract with the Grizzlies.

Minnesota Timberwolves (2012–2014)

On July 24, 2012, Cunningham was traded to the Minnesota Timberwolves in exchange for Wayne Ellington.

New Orleans Pelicans (2014–2018)
On December 4, 2014, Cunningham signed with the New Orleans Pelicans. On July 9, 2015, he re-signed with the Pelicans. On September 25, 2017, he re-signed with the Pelicans.

Brooklyn Nets (2018)
On February 8, 2018, Cunningham was traded to the Brooklyn Nets in exchange for Rashad Vaughn.

San Antonio Spurs (2018–2019)
On July 20, 2018, Cunningham signed with the San Antonio Spurs.

Fujian Sturgeons (2019–2020)
On December 11, 2019, Cunningham was listed in the squad of Fujian Sturgeons and made his debut for Fujian Sturgeons on the next day, scoring fourteen points and collecting eight rebounds in a 111–107 win over the Beijing Ducks. He averaged 15 points and 7 rebounds per game.

Cangrejeros de Santurce (2021)
On July 7, 2021, Cunningham signed with the Cangrejeros de Santurce of the Baloncesto Superior Nacional. In 10 games, he averaged 11.5 points, 6.1 rebounds, 1.6 steals and 1.1 assists per game.

Le Mans Sarthe Basket (2021–2022)
On August 27, 2021, Cunningham signed with Le Mans Sarthe Basket of the LNB Pro A.

NBA career statistics

Regular season

|-
| align="left" | 
| align="left" | Portland
| 63 || 2 || 11.2 || .495 || – || .646 || 2.5 || .2 || .4 || .4 || 3.9
|-
| align="left" | 
| align="left" | Portland
| 56 || 9 || 19.8 || .433 || .000 || .711 || 3.4 || .5 || .7 || .6 || 5.1
|-
| align="left" | 
| align="left" | Charlotte
| 22 || 9 || 24.0 || .508 || .111 || .765 || 4.0 || .6 || .7 || .5 || 9.0
|-
| align="left" | 
| align="left" | Memphis
| 64 || 5 || 17.6 || .516 || – || .652 || 3.8 || .6 || .7 || .5 || 5.2
|-
| align="left" | 
| align="left" | Minnesota
| 80 || 9 || 25.1 || .468 || .000 || .650 || 5.1 || .8 || 1.1 || .5 || 8.7
|-
| align="left" | 
| align="left" | Minnesota
| 81 || 7 || 20.2 || .464 || .000 || .567 || 4.1 || 1.0 || .8 || .7 || 6.3
|-
| align="left" | 
| align="left" | New Orleans
| 66 || 27 || 25.0 || .457 || .100 || .617 || 3.9 || .8 || .7 || .6 || 5.2
|-
| align="left" | 
| align="left" | New Orleans
| 80 || 46 || 24.6 || .451 || .316 || .695 || 3.0 || 1.0 || .5 || .4 || 6.1
|-
| align="left" | 
| align="left" | New Orleans
| 66 || 35 || 25.0 || .485 || .392 || .593 || 4.2 || .6 || .6 || .4 || 6.6
|-
| align="left" | 
| align="left" | New Orleans
| 51 || 24 || 21.9 || .440 || .324 || .556 || 3.8 || .5 || .5 || .3 || 5.0
|-
| align="left" | 
| align="left" | Brooklyn
| 22 || 1 || 20.3 || .468 || .383 || .688 || 4.8 || 1.0 || .5 || .6 || 7.5
|-
| align="left" | 
| align="left" | San Antonio
| 64 || 21 || 14.5 || .475 || .462 || .778 || 2.9 || .8 || .4 || .2 || 3.0
|-
| style="text-align:center;" colspan="2"| Career
| 715 || 195 || 20.8 || .469 || .345 || .649 || 3.7 || .7 || .6 || .5 || 5.8

Playoffs

|-
| align="left" | 2010
| align="left" | Portland
| 5 || 0 || 8.4 || .600 || .000 || .833 || 2.6 || .0 || 1.0 || .0 || 4.6
|-
| align="left" | 2012
| align="left" | Memphis
| 7 || 0 || 7.0 || .364 || – || – || 1.6 || .0 || .1 || .3 || 1.1
|-
| align="left" | 2015
| align="left" | New Orleans
| 4 || 0 || 18.8 || .818 || – || 1.000 || 4.5 || .5 || .8 || 1.0 || 5.3
|-
| align="left" | 2019
| align="left" | San Antonio
| 5 || 0 || 2.6 || .667 || 1.000 || – || 1.2 || .0 || .0 || .0 || 1.2
|-
| style="text-align:center;" colspan="2"| Career
| 21 || 0 || 8.5 || .600 || .667 || .889 || 2.3 || .1 || .4 || .3 || 2.8

Personal life
On April 3, 2014, Cunningham was arrested for allegedly choking his girlfriend with whom he lived. Three days later, he was arrested on alleged domestic abuse charges. By August 18, 2014, charges were dropped, due to evidence Cunningham's then girlfriend had fabricated her accusations.

Cunningham was included on a preliminary list for Great Britain's Eurobasket 2009 qualifying matches in 2008. However, he was later ruled ineligible to compete for Britain after an investigation by British Basketball officials into his ancestral ties failed to prove his case to receive UK citizenship.

References

External links

1987 births
Living people
20th-century African-American people
21st-century African-American sportspeople
African-American basketball players
American expatriate basketball people in China
American men's basketball players
Basketball players from Maryland
Brooklyn Nets players
Charlotte Bobcats players
Fujian Sturgeons players
Le Mans Sarthe Basket players
Memphis Grizzlies players
Minnesota Timberwolves players
New Orleans Pelicans players
People from Clinton, Maryland
Portland Trail Blazers draft picks
Portland Trail Blazers players
Power forwards (basketball)
San Antonio Spurs players
Small forwards
Sportspeople from the Washington metropolitan area
Villanova Wildcats men's basketball players